Ottestad Church is a parish church of the Church of Norway in Stange Municipality in Innlandet county, Norway. It is located in the village of Ottestad. It is the church for the Ottestad parish which is part of the Hamar domprosti (deanery) in the Diocese of Hamar. The white, wooden church was built in a cruciform design in 1731 using plans drawn up by the architect Even Baardset. The church seats about 350 people.

History
The earliest existing historical records of the church date back to the mid-13th century when it was mentioned in the book Hákonar saga Hákonarsonar as  near Hamar. This church was a wooden stave church that was likely built during the early 13th century. Not much is known about this old building. By the early 1600s, the church was described as being "dilapidated and old-fashioned". Around the year 1627, the old church was torn down and a new church was built on the same site. The church tower was built in 1630. The church didn't take long to fall into disrepair and by the early 1700s, the church was already rotting and beginning to fall apart. Also, the parish council determined that the church was not built at a good location and set out to find a new location nearby for the church. The new church was a half-timbered cruciform building that was built by Even Baardset who modeled the church after the Our Saviour's Church in Christiania. The new church was consecrated on 17 January 1731.

Media gallery

See also
List of churches in Hamar

References

Stange
Churches in Innlandet
Cruciform churches in Norway
Wooden churches in Norway
18th-century Church of Norway church buildings
Churches completed in 1731
13th-century establishments in Norway